Siegerland Airport  or Siegerlandflughafen in German is a small regional airport in Burbach in the Siegerland region near Siegen, Germany. It was formerly served by the Scheuerfeld–Emmerzhausen railway and is presently used as the maintenance base for Avanti Air.

Airlines and destinations
There are no scheduled services to and from Siegerland Airport. It is largely used for general aviation and parachuting.

Motorsports
On 8 September 1985 the airport hosted a DTM race, the circuit was called Siegerlandring.

Lap Records
The official race lap records at Siegerland Airport are listed as:

See also
 Transport in Germany
 List of airports in Germany

References

External links

 Official website

Siegerland
Airport